The Cathedral of Our Lady of Mount Carmel, also known as Jolo Cathedral, is a Roman Catholic cathedral in Jolo, Sulu and the seat of the Apostolic Vicariate of Jolo. The cathedral is located in Jolo, a volcanic island in Sulu Province of the Bangsamoro Autonomous Region in Muslim Mindanao in the Philippines. The cathedral is dedicated to the Virgin Mary under the title Our Lady of Mount Carmel.

Attacks 
On January 10, 2010, a grenade thrown at the tombs of Francis Joseph McSorley and Benjamin de Jesus, two former bishops, caused no injuries but shattered the windows. The blast occurred an hour before a mass was scheduled to be celebrated. There were no injuries.

On May 20, 2010, a grenade exploded in front of the cathedral at 9:30 in the evening. The cathedral suffered minor damage. There were no reported fatalities or injuries.

2019 bombings 

On January 27, 2019, the cathedral was bombed during a mass, killing at least 18 people and injuring 82 others. The Islamic State claimed responsibility for the attack.

The church building was repaired following the attacks. It was reconsecrated in July 2019.

2020 bombing

On August 24, 2020, two bombings occurred in Jolo, resulting in the deaths of seven soldiers, six civilians, one police officer and a bomber, while 75 other people were wounded. One of the two attacks was carried out by a female suicide bomber near the cathedral.

References 

Buildings and structures completed in 1864
Buildings and structures in Sulu
Churches destroyed by Muslims
Roman Catholic cathedrals in the Philippines
19th-century religious buildings and structures in the Philippines